Tancred is an unincorporated community and census-designated place (CDP) in Yolo County, California. It lies at an elevation of 299 feet (91 m).

History
The community of Tancred, named for Tancred, Prince of Galilee, was formed by the Western Cooperative Colonization and Improvement Company. These families shared their resources in farming as well as constructing community areas such as a nursery and park.
A post office in the town was open between 1892 and 1932. A frost in 1896 killed many of the fruit trees in the area, which led the company into bankruptcy and many of the coop farmers to lose their land. Future land owners were able to find grain and nuts to grow in this colder part of the county, but the community hasn't grown much since its inception.

References

External links

Census-designated places in California
Census-designated places in Yolo County, California